Fryzel is a surname. Notable people with the surname include:

Dennis Fryzel (1942–2009), American football coach
Jimmy Fryzel (born 1981), American football player
Michael E. Fryzel, American attorney and government official